Davainea is a genus of flatworms belonging to the family Davaineidae.

The genus has cosmopolitan distribution.

Species:

Davainea andrei 
Davainea proglottina 
Davainea tetraoensis

References

Platyhelminthes